Comesperma volubile, commonly known as love creeper, is a slender climber in the family Polygalaceae. It is a twining plant with linear leaves and pea-like blue flowers.

Description

Taxonomy and naming
Comersperma voluble was first formally described in 1806 by Jacques Labillardière, and the description was published in Novæ Hollandiæ plantarum specimen.The specific epithet (volubile) means "twining".

Distribution and habitat
Love creeper occurs in heathland and forest in the states of Western Australia, South Australia, Tasmania, Victoria, New South Wales and Queensland, in Australia.

References

volubile
Flora of New South Wales
Flora of Queensland
Flora of South Australia
Flora of Victoria (Australia)
Flora of Tasmania
Flora of Western Australia
Taxa named by Jacques Labillardière
Plants described in 1806